The Honda Aviator was a motor scooter produced by Honda Motorcycle and Scooter India. Its slogan is "Live Your Style". It has a four-stroke  single-cylinder engine, HET air-cooled engine (the same as in the Dio and the Activa) which produces 8 bhp at 7000 rpm and maximum torque of 8.77 Nm at 5500 rpm. The scooter has V-Matic transmission and can be kick-started or self-started. With the recently updated Honda Eco Technology (HET) the scooter has company-claimed efficiency of 60 km/L.

In 2018, the scooter received a minor update from Honda which included a new instrument console and LED headlamp.

It was discontinued in April 2020 after the BS6 emission norms took effect.

References

External links

Aviator
Indian motor scooters
Motorcycles introduced in 2009